is a Japanese athlete. He competed in the men's triple jump at the 1960 Summer Olympics and the 1964 Summer Olympics.

References

1936 births
Living people
Athletes (track and field) at the 1960 Summer Olympics
Athletes (track and field) at the 1964 Summer Olympics
Japanese male triple jumpers
Olympic athletes of Japan
Asian Games medalists in athletics (track and field)
Asian Games silver medalists for Japan
Asian Games bronze medalists for Japan
Athletes (track and field) at the 1958 Asian Games
Athletes (track and field) at the 1962 Asian Games
Medalists at the 1958 Asian Games
Medalists at the 1962 Asian Games
Sportspeople from Shizuoka Prefecture
Universiade bronze medalists for Japan
Universiade medalists in athletics (track and field)
Medalists at the 1961 Summer Universiade